X-ray sources  around us. They include the following:

 Natural X-ray sources:
 Astrophysical X-ray source, as viewed in X-ray astronomy
 X-ray background
 Naturally occurring radionuclides
 Artificial X-ray sources
 Radiopharmaceuticals in radiopharmacology
 Radioactive tracer
 Brachytherapy
 X-ray tube, a vacuum tube that produces X-rays when current flows through it
 X-ray laser
 X-ray generator, any of various devices using X-ray tubes, lasers, or radioisotopes
 Synchrotron, which produces X-rays as synchrotron radiation
 Cyclotron, which produces X-rays as cyclotron radiation